The Veterans Memorial Bridge in Rochester, New York, carries New York State Route 104 (less well known as the Keeler Street Expressway) across the Genesee River. The bridge is an architecturally significant concrete arch faced with white granite.

The bridge was originally connected to a traffic circle but was changed to an interchange in the 1960s.

Additional links have been included below for background information for future expansion of this article.

References

External links
 State Bridge Wins Statewide Award For Partnering Practices (Monroe County) 020103
 $34M USD rehab project to be completed Fall 2001
 History of Rochester - an Illustrated Timeline courtesy of an historian
part of Seneca Park, one of three major parks in Rochester designed by Frederick Law Olmsted, is located in the shadow of the bridge
 a late '90s rehab utilized an innovative safety deck for the workers on the bridge
several popular walking trails intersect near the bridge.

Bridges completed in 1931
Bridges in Rochester, New York
Genesee River
Monuments and memorials in New York (state)
Road bridges in New York (state)
Arch bridges in the United States
Concrete bridges in the United States